The 1980–81 Soviet League Season was the 35th year of competition in the Soviet Championship League. CSKA Moscow won the championship, its 5th in a row and 24th overall.

First round

Final round

Relegation

External links
Season on hockeystars.ru

1
Soviet League seasons
Sov